Lukáš Vašina (born 6 July 1999) is a Czech professional volleyball player. He is a member of the Czech Republic national team. At the professional club level, he plays for PGE Skra Bełchatów.

Personal life
His father, Lubomír is a volleyball coach.

Honours
 National championships
 2020/2021  Czech Championship, with ČEZ Karlovarsko
 2021/2022  Czech SuperCup, with ČEZ Karlovarsko
 2021/2022  Czech Championship, with ČEZ Karlovarsko

Youth national team
 2017  CEV U19 European Championship
 2018  CEV U20 European Championship

References

External links
 
 Player profile at PlusLiga.pl  
 Player profile at Volleybox.net

1999 births
Living people
People from Ústí nad Orlicí District
Sportspeople from the Pardubice Region
Czech men's volleyball players
Czech expatriate sportspeople in Poland
Expatriate volleyball players in Poland
Skra Bełchatów players
Outside hitters